The  was a cabinet-level ministry in the Daijō-kan system of government of the Meiji period Empire of Japan from 1870 to 1885. It is also sometimes referred to as the “Ministry of Engineering” or “Ministry of Industry”.

History 
The Cabinet officially decided to establish the Public Works (Kobu Sho) on December 12, 1870, by the advice of Edmund Morel, chief engineer of the Railway Department to achieve rapid social and industrial development.

Morel intended to found the Public Works which develop social and industrial infrastructure, while leading cabinet members wanted an engine to drive rapid industrialization. Through long arguments initiated by Hirobumi Ito and Yozo Yamao, on September 28, 1871, the Meiji government eventually formed the Public Works with 11 departments, which were mostly transferred from the Ministry of Civil Affairs (Minbu Sho)). It included railroads, shipyards, lighthouses, mines, an iron and steel industry, telecommunication, civil works, manufacturing, industrial promotion, engineering institution and survey. As the civil works and survey department were soon transferred to other ministries, the public works were oriented to industrial development with help of foreign advisors and engineers for a whole.

The public works employed a large number of foreign officers, so called Oyatoi, and their high salaries got heavy burden for the government. They were gradually replaced by Japanese engineers who were produced by the Imperial College of Engineering.

References 

Classical Japan
Former government ministries of Japan
Meiji period